Garja Man Rai is a Bhutanese politician who has been a member of the National Assembly of Bhutan, since October 2018.

Education
He holds a Bachelor of Science in Information Technology degree from India.

Political career
Before joining politics, he has served as an IT engineer.

He was elected to the National Assembly of Bhutan as a candidate of DNT from Sergithang-Tsirang-Toed constituency in 2018 Bhutanese National Assembly election. He received 6,077 votes and defeated Kewal Ram Adhakari, a candidate of DPT.

References 

1984 births
Living people
Bhutanese MNAs 2018–2023
Druk Nyamrup Tshogpa politicians
Druk Nyamrup Tshogpa MNAs
Bhutanese people of Nepalese descent
Rai people